Subordinator may refer to
 Subordination (linguistics), hierarchical organization in linguistics
 Subordinator (mathematics), a stochastic process